Schober, a German term for a small barn or a haystack, is common as an occupational surname, metonymic for a farmer, and as a name for haystack-shaped mountains.

People named Schober
 Aurelia Frances Schober (1906–1994), mother of the poet Sylvia Plath
 Barbara Schober (born 1958), German visual artist
 Bernadette Schober (born 1984), Austrian racing cyclist
 Franz von Schober (1796-1882), Austrian poet, librettist, lithographer, and actor
 Johann Schober (1874-1932), three-time Chancellor of Austria
 John C. Schober (born 1961), American politician and lawyer
 Mathias Schober (born 1976), German football goalkeeper
 Michael Schober (born 1964), American psychologist 
 Olga Schoberová (born 1943), Czech actress
  (1865-1943), German physician who developed Schober's test 
 Rita Schober (1918-2012), German scholar of Romance studies and literature who championed Emile Zola and organised translations of his books.
 Sonja Schöber (born 1985), German swimmer
 William Schober (born 1956), Australian figure skater
 Wolfgang Schober (born 1989), Austrian football goalkeeper

Mountains

There are about 20 mountains, minor summits, and hills named "(great/high) haystack" in Austria alone. Among these are:
 The Hochschober (3,242 m), after which the Schober Group has been named.
 Schober (2,967 m) in the Ankogel Group in Carinthia
 Schober (1,328 m) on the border of Upper Austria and Salzburg
 The Schober Pass (849 m) in the Niedere Tauern in Styria

Other
 2871 Schober, an asteroid

References

German-language surnames
Occupational surnames
Mountains of Austria
Toponymic surnames